is a city in central Aichi Prefecture, Japan. , the city had an estimated population of 71,992 in 32,579 households, and a population density of 4,414 persons per km².

Geography

Chiryū is situated in central Aichi Prefecture bordered by the Aizuma River to the north and the Sawatari River to the south.

Climate
The city has a climate characterized by hot and humid summers, and relatively mild winters (Köppen climate classification Cfa).  The average annual temperature in Chiryū is 15.7 °C. The average annual rainfall is 1579 mm with September as the wettest month. The temperatures are highest on average in August, at around 27.9 °C, and lowest in January, at around 4.3 °C.

Demographics
Per Japanese census data, the population of Chiryū has been increasing steadily over the past 70 years.

Neighboring municipalities
Aichi Prefecture
Toyota
Kariya
Anjō

History

Ancient history
"Chiryū" as a local place name appears in documents in the Nara period, and was located within former Mikawa Province.

Early modern period
During the Edo period, the area prospered as Chiryū-juku, one of the post stations on the Tōkaidō connecting Edo with Kyoto.
The town was noted for its horse trading fairs. Part of the present day city were under the control of Kariya Domain, a feudal han under the Tokugawa shogunate.

Late modern period
After the Meiji restoration, Chiryū Town was created within Hekikai District, Aichi Prefecture on 1 October 1889 with the establishment of the modern municipalities system.

Contemporary history
Chiryū attained city status on 1 December 1970.

Government

Chiryū has a mayor-council form of government with a directly elected mayor and a unicameral city legislature of 20 members. The city contributes one member to the Aichi Prefectural Assembly.  In terms of national politics, the city is part of Aichi District 13 of the lower house of the Diet of Japan.

Economy
The economy of Chiryū is industrial, with automotive parts and automotive electronics manufacturing predominating. Fuji Corporation, a machine tool manufacturer, has its head office and factory in Chiryū. The city has numerous road and rail connections to downtown Nagoya and is increasingly becoming a commuter town.

Education

Schools
Chiryū has seven public elementary schools and three public middle schools operated by the city government, and two public high schools operated by the Aichi Prefectural Board of Education. There is also one private high school and three private vocational training schools.

Transportation

Railways

Conventional lines
 Meitetsu
Nagoya Main Line：- Ushida –  –
Mikawa Line：-  –  –

Roads

Japan National Route

Local attractions
Chiryū Jinja – Shinto shrine, with a tahōtō built in 1907, which has been designated as an Important Cultural Property
 Yatsuhashi Kakitsubata Garden (八橋かきつばた園) at the Muryoju-ji Temple which has been known for its water garden and Iris laevigata since the Heian period. It is also the place where the Ariwara no Narihira wrote a poem in the Ise Monogatari using the five initial letters of Ka-Ki-Tsu-Ba-Ta. The poem goes:
KArakoromo KItsutsu narenishi TSUma shi areba HArubaru kinuru TAbi wo shi zo omou (HA can also be read BA).

The Kikatsubata is the prefectural flower of Aichi prefecture as well as of Chiryū City. Each year at the end of April a festival is held in the temple garden as a celebration of the flowering.

External relations

Twin towns – Sister cities

International
Wyndham（Victoria, Australia）
since 10 February 2000

National
Ina（Nagano Prefecture, Chūbu region）
since 7 November 1994

Notable people from Chiryū 
Seiji Suzuki – politician
Ryoha Kitagawa – former idol

References

External links

  

Cities in Aichi Prefecture
Chiryū, Aichi